This is a list of seasons for the Pacific Coast Hockey Association professional men's ice hockey league, which existed from 1912 to 1924.

Teams

† Stanley Cup Champions.
The 1915 Stanley Cup Finals were the first organized as a pre-scheduled playoff between the two teams that won that year's PCHA and National Hockey Association (NHA) league championships, a one-off arrangement agreed to by the Stanley Cup trustee. Prior to this, individual teams would file with the Stanley Cup trustee with an official challenge to face the existing Cup holder. The following year, the Stanley Cup trustee deemed this league-vs-league format would be an ongoing arrangement. 
PCHA champion Seattle's victory at the 1917 Stanley Cup Finals marked the first time a non-Canadian team won the Cup.  

‡ Portland was 1915–16 PCHA regular season PCHA champion, but did not claim the Stanley Cup.
 As Portland had not defeated Cup holder Vancouver of the PCHA in a direct playoff showdown, they could not claim the Cup. Instead, the new Cup holder was determined at the pre-arranged 1916 Stanley Cup Finals between the champions of the PCHA and NHA.
 The PCHA's Portland based champion made this the first Cup finals to feature a non-Canadian finalist.

‡‡ Vancouver claimed the Cup by defeating existing Cup holder Seattle in the 1917-18 PCHA playoffs, but lost in the scheduled Cup finals to Toronto, champions of the new National Hockey League (NHL).
The format of a league's playoffs determining the passing of the Stanley Cup had been the norm during the Challenge Cup era of 1893–1914. Vancouver's claim to the Cup in 1917 would be the last time a claim of this type was used.
This was the first Cup finals held after the NHA suspended operations in order to get rid of unwanted owner Eddie Livingstone, with the remaining NHA team owners creating the NHL.

See also
 List of Stanley Cup champions

References

     
Ice hockey-related lists